The 2022–23 Missouri Tigers women's basketball represents the University of Missouri in the 2022–23 college basketball season. Led by thirteenth year head coach Robin Pingeton, the team plays their games at Mizzou Arena and are members of the Southeastern Conference.

Previous season
The Tgers finished the season 18–13 (18–13 SEC) to finish eighth place in the conference. The Tigers were invited to the 2022 Women's National Invitation Tournament where they lost to Drake in the first round.

Offseason

Departures

2022 Recruiting Class

Incoming Transfers

Roster

Schedule and results

|-
!colspan=12 style=""| Exhibition
|-

|-
!colspan=12 style=""| Non-conference regular season

|-
!colspan=12 style=""| SEC regular season

|-
!colspan=9 style=""| SEC Tournament

|-
!colspan=9 style=""|  WNIT

Rankings

See also
 2022–23 Missouri Tigers men's basketball team

References

Missouri Tigers women's basketball seasons
Missouri Tigers
Missouri Tigers women's basketball
Missouri Tigers women's basketball